Ewan Henderson (born 27 March 2000) is a Scottish professional footballer who plays as a midfielder for Scottish Premiership club Hibernian. Henderson has previously played for Celtic, Ross County and Dunfermline Athletic.

Club career

Celtic
Henderson came through the Celtic youth ranks, winning the Glasgow Cup with the under-17 team in 2017, as well as featuring in the UEFA Youth League, Scottish Challenge Cup and Premier League International Cup. He made his senior debut for Celtic on 9 May 2018 against Kilmarnock in the Scottish Premiership.

He started his first game for Celtic on 24 February 2019, in a 4–1 home win over Motherwell in which he was named man of the match.

On 2 September 2019, he moved on loan to Ross County.

On 26 March 2021 he signed on loan for Dunfermline Athletic.

Hibernian
On 6 January 2022 he moved on loan to Hibernian, with the transfer to become permanent in the summer. On 23 April 2022, Henderson scored his first goal for Hibernian, which proved decisive in a 1–0 win at St Mirren in the Scottish Premiership.

International career
Henderson represented Scotland at under-17 youth international level.

Personal life
His older brother Liam is also a footballer, and has also played for Celtic and Hibernian. Their father Nicky was also a footballer.

Career statistics

References

2000 births
Living people
Scottish footballers
Scotland youth international footballers
Scotland under-21 international footballers
Association football midfielders
Celtic F.C. players
Ross County F.C. players
Dunfermline Athletic F.C. players
Scottish Professional Football League players
Hibernian F.C. players